Padikkadha Pannaiyar is a 1985 Indian Tamil-language drama film, directed by K. S. Gopalakrishnan and produced by G. Sulochana. The film stars Sivaji Ganesan, K. R. Vijaya, Y. G. Mahendra and V. K. Ramasamy. It is a remake of the director's own film Kan Kanda Deivam. It was Vijaya's 200th film as an actress.

Plot

Cast 
Sivaji Ganesan
K. R. Vijaya
Anuradha
Y. G. Mahendran
V. K. Ramasamy
Dilip
Thengai Srinivasan
Jayamala
Culcutta Viswanathan
V. S. Raghavan
Achamillai Gopi
Venu Aravind
V. Gopalakrishnan
Shanmugasundaram
Pasi Sathya
Bayilvan Ranganathan
Ennatha Kannaiya

Soundtrack 
The soundtrack for the movie composed by Ilaiyaraaja. The lyrics for the songs were written by Vaali, Gangai Amaran and K.S. Gopalakrishnan.

Reception
Jayamanmadhan of Kalki wrote the title of the film itself suggests that the story is about twenty years back.

References

External links 
 

1980s Tamil-language films
1985 drama films
1985 films
Films directed by K. S. Gopalakrishnan
Films scored by Ilaiyaraaja
Films with screenplays by K. S. Gopalakrishnan
Indian drama films